A chauffeur is a person employed to drive a passenger motor vehicle, especially a luxury vehicle such as a large sedan or limousine.

Originally, such drivers were often personal employees of the vehicle owner, but this has changed to specialist chauffeur service companies or individual drivers that provide both driver and vehicle for hire. Some service companies merely provide the driver.

History
The term chauffeur comes from the French term for stoker because the earliest automobiles, like their railroad and sea vessel counterparts, were steam-powered and required the driver to stoke the engine. Early petrol/gasoline-powered motor cars, before the advent of electric ignition, were ignited by 'hot tubes' in the cylinder head which had to be pre-heated before the engine would start. Hence the term chauffeur which, in this context, means something like "heater-upper". The chauffeur would prime the hot tubes at the start of a journey, after which the natural compression cycle of the engine would keep them at the correct temperature. The chauffeur also maintained the car, including routine maintenance and cleaning, and had to be a skilled mechanic to deal with breakdowns and tyre punctures en route, which were very common in the earliest years of the automobile.

Only the very wealthy could afford the first automobiles, and they generally employed chauffeurs rather than driving themselves. A 1906 article in The New York Times reported that "the chauffeur problem to-day is one of the most serious that the automobilist has to deal with", and complained that "young men of no particular ability, who have been earning from $10 to $12 a week, are suddenly elevated to salaried positions paying from $25 to $50" and recommended the re-training of existing coach drivers.

Scope
While the term may refer to anybody who drives for a living, it usually implies a driver of an elegant passenger vehicle such as a horse-drawn carriage, luxury sedan, motor coach, or especially a limousine; those who operate buses or non-passenger vehicles are generally referred to as "drivers". In some countries, particularly developing nations where a ready supply of labor ensures that even the middle classes can afford domestic staff and among the wealthy, the chauffeur may simply be called the "driver".

People currently sometimes employ chauffeurs full-time to drive themselves in their own personal vehicles, yet there are also professional services offering limousines or rental cars driven by chauffeurs. This is very similar to but much more luxurious than taking a taxicab. A variety of benefits are cited for using chauffeurs, including convenience, productivity and time savings, and driving safety for business people and seniors. Insurance costs for luxury vehicles are often lower if the designated driver is a chauffeur.

The legal requirements to be a chauffeur vary depending on the local jurisdiction and class of vehicle. In some cases, a simple permit is all that is required, but in others an additional professional license is needed with certain minimum standards in areas such as: age, health, driving experience, criminal record, local geographic knowledge, training attended.

Training
In addition to the minimum legal requirements, limousine companies often require their chauffeurs to undergo specific extra training. These courses may involve evasive driving or defensive driving techniques, the proper methods to ensure safety in the most extreme conditions such as inclement weather, a flat tire at high speeds, or other exterior influences for loss of vehicular control, etc. Most companies also have their own courses as to what they expect from their chauffeurs. Chauffeurs may be taught proper etiquette for use when they are in presence of their clientele. They may also be trained for services to the client beyond the car itself, such as for a personal valet or bodyguard. Many companies and local licensing agencies currently require random drug screening – in the United States this was especially the case after professional ice hockey player Vladimir Konstantinov's career-ending injuries when his recently hired chauffeur, Richard Gnida, lost control of their limousine and crashed.

Dress
In many places (or at times in the past), proper physical presence is presented by the chauffeur at all times. This usually includes a well-groomed individual, conservatively dressed in a clean and crisply pressed black or dark business suit or tuxedo, dress shirt, and appropriately matching tie, with black leather gloves and freshly polished matching footwear. In some areas, such as Japan, white gloves are the norm. Some companies have complete uniforms for their chauffeurs, and some require that hats be worn as part of the uniform.

Notable chauffeurs
 William Grover-Williams, chauffeur to William Orpen
 Julius Schreck, chauffeur to Adolf Hitler from 1926 to 1936
 Kay Summersby, chauffeur to Supreme Commander Allied Expeditionary Force Dwight D. Eisenhower
 Roosevelt Zanders, drove Fidel Castro, Richard Nixon, Winston Churchill, Eleanor Roosevelt, Harry S. Truman, and many others

In fiction
 Aloysius "Nosey" Parker
 Thomas Watkins
 Driving Miss Daisy: 1987 play, 1989 film, and 2014 film
 Frank Martin, driver in The Transporter series of films
 Bitterman (Ted Ross), chauffeur for Arthur Bach (Dudley Moore) in the 1981 film Arthur
 Tom Branson, chauffeur turned son-in-law of Lord Grantham in Downton Abbey
 Alfred Pennyworth, Bruce Wayne's tireless valet, assistant, butler, chauffeur, confidant, best friend, and surrogate father figure
 Logan in Logan
 Kato the chauffeur and assistant to The Green Hornet

References

External links

 

 
Personal care and service occupations